Minas Halaj (born November 5, 1981 in Yerevan), is an Armenian-American painter artist.

Biography
Minas Halaj was born in Yerevan, Armenia, in the family of artist Samuel Hallaj.

1992–1996 Minas Halaj studied at Hakob Kojoyan Art School, Yerevan, Armenia, 1996-1998-
Terlemezian College of Fine Art, Yerevan, Armenia, 1998–2002 Yerevan's State Fine Arts Academy.https://www.yerevan.am/en/yerevan-state-academy-of-fine-arts/
And 2003–2006 https://sfai.edu/, San Francisco, CA. Minas Halaj works in oil, mixed media, and graphics. His graphic series, entitled Magnetic Flower is a mixture of many different styles, influences, and elements. He incorporates flowers, nature, animals, anatomy, and Roman sculpture techniques.

Minas Halaj has got paintings from American Renaissance and "Floral Minds" paintings that reflect the immigrant experience, each picture with a hallowed space that expresses a cry for home, the memories of a place, history, and culture, the violence of its loss and the rupturing of the spirit. Many of his paintings are with private collectors, including actors and famous people like Jim Carrey Ryan O'Neal Victor Drai Ziggy Marley Queen Latifah Billy Zane

"Floral Minds"

The concept of beauty is a burdened one. We are living in a society that fears its adoration of contemporary art, yet intimidates its women into accepting it as their highest value. We have degraded it in mass media and the celebrity yet revere it above all other qualities of life. Beauty is a double-edged sword an instrument of seduction and inaccessibility burdened sword an overwhelming distrust in the simple sensation
of pleasure.
I think we are all floral minds! selections from the Floral Minds
Collection, artist Minas Halaj also creates his mixed-media assemblage artworks with an unusual assortment of materials. Painting his subjects with oil, his complex work often includes tar, fabric, wood, elaborate appliqués, recycled paper, or odd buttons. Seemingly random, his compositions are anything but, as the classically rendered subjects reminiscent of Old World Masters look solemnly back at you, adorned with elaborate cornucopias of flowers and fanciful fabrics. In many instances, his precision in creating graceful classic beauties is juxtaposed against a grainy highly-textural sculpted tar background that is painstakingly embossed and minutely decorated. Son of the accomplished Armenian painter Samuel Halaj, Minas has received multiple degrees in art from his native Yerevan and has continued his formal art training at several California schools since he arrived in the US in 2002. His beautifully intricate art has been featured in nearly 50 contemporary art exhibits around the world, with many pieces now residing in high-profile international collections.
Text by Dale Youngman

"The Trouble with Flowers"

Text By Danna Lorch, Middle Eastern Studies from Harvard University.

Minas Halaj creates what he can't have. In this case that is pure green space. If he returned to his native country of Armenia with its cerulean skies, twisting rivers, and rugged mountain ranges, his brush would inevitably veer towards gritty cityscapes.
He works from a studio that straddles the border between Los Angeles and Hollywood. Dusty palm trees line an industrial block of warehouses. Pollution hovers over the Hollywood skyline, adding a dreamy haziness to the concrete jungle that mimics the opening scene from a classic film.
The portraits comprising Halaj's ongoing Floral Minds series examine the inherent human longing to live in harmony with nature despite the competing pull of the modern, plugged-in world. From political personalities to dewy fashion models, these are the people who stop to snap the selfie which pops up on your social media feed as you relax on your living room couch. These are the glamorous, self-titled “public figures” who materialize larger than life on all your devices and yet can also vanish in the blink of an eye with just one boring scroll of the thumb.
Halaj is propelled by the belief that “There is a unique flower inside each of us that grows and changes form and color. The flowers are in our veins and part of our anatomy. We are innately connected to nature, but there is a conflict within that pulls us towards the more complicated wider world.”
Even though the details of their faces are camouflaged by ornate bouquets of wildflowers, the subjects here are still relatable. In a sense, each distinctive choice of flowers conveys a more intimate and vulnerable reading of a person than a conventional glimpse of the visage could offer. The majority of the Floral Minds works are numbered rather than titled. #1 is Halaj's wife. Despite their obscured faces, several of the subjects are easily recognizable to those who keep up with American pop culture. #10 is clearly President Trump, his open mouth spouting blossoms rather than angry rhetoric.
The Bluebird (which does not have a corresponding number) is a vanitas, riffing off Medieval funerary art in which a skull and fresh flowers pointed to the inevitability of life ending in death and decay. The bluebird perched on the fresh-faced subject's forearm is so realistic it seems possible to glimpse its heart thundering through its shiny plumage. And yet, Halaj seems to be saying, even these young things are destined to age. What matters most is the present moment.
Buddhist teachings often speak of the lotus flower, a resilient pink bloom that grows in even the thickest of mud. The lotus is symbolic of an aspiration to reach spiritual purity despite earthly troubles. Halaj agrees with a sigh. “The flowers are a hint of paradise. As humans, we live in modern society but don’t realize that paradise is right here.”
Disturbingly, Floral Minds #39 depicts an infamous mass shooter. How can a face so often associated with evil be obscured in exquisite flowers? Halaj painted the portrait as a kind of therapeutic action to try to make sense of the deadliest shooting in
United States history. He says, “As a result of the gun regulations we have in the US, there are innocent children and adults getting killed. The flowers are squeezing the shooter’s neck. They are covering parts of his personality he doesn’t want the world to see.”
This alludes to the restrained violence at play just beneath the surface of Floral Minds. Halaj uses his hands to apply wet cement and viscid street tar to his canvases; background textures that are hard to fully appreciate on Instagram. Perpetually influenced by fashion's great ateliers and their fabled or fraught relationships with Hollywood celebrities, he trawls estate sales for valuable Victorian wedding gowns which he then nonchalantly shreds for collaging. There is an unresolved tension here between natural and manufactured forms of beauty, between a commitment to traditional portraiture and medium-bending defiance, and even between irrepressible evil and naive goodness.
Coming of age during Armenia's war with Azerbaijan, Halaj grew up with an artist for a father, the painter Samuel Hallaj. He wasn't allowed to touch anything in the generator-powered studio but often loitered in the shadows stretching to follow the unspoken conversation his father's paintbrush held with each canvas. Despite his father's discouragement to take on an artist's unpredictable lifestyle, Halaj started to create his own art, first selling work on paper to a visiting European Union diplomat.
He then attended the State Academy of Fine Arts in Yerevan to study classical portraiture but soon left for the United States with just a little cash and a desire to break out on his own. With a BFA from the San Francisco Art Institute and a suitcase filled with paintbrushes, he moved to Los Angeles and quickly became part of the city's experimental art scene with shows coinciding
with Art Basel Miami three years running and work from Floral Minds included in Faces in the Crowd, a 2016 group exhibition at Art Share L.A.
Standing at his easel in Los Angeles Halaj admits, “It took many years to forget what I’d learned in classical painting and do things with my hands that broke all the rules.” However conceptual his practice might evolve, Halaj's work will always betray hints of that journey.
In Floral Minds #34, a fashion model's face is upturned towards the viewers, her mouth slightly ajar to show off perfect white teeth, her eyes replaced by a delicate
tapestry of flora. This fragility is contradicted by the rough collage of raw-edged paper strips Halaj has used to outfit the subject—a hint at the coarseness of industrial society. Although from a distance these portraits have a classical air, upon close inspection it becomes obvious that they are not entirely pretty. There is an unpredictable complexity to Floral Minds that makes it possible to discover something new each time the canvases are encountered.

Exhibitions 
Minas' first solo show was at the Tracy Park Gallery in Santa Monica, California. Since then he has participated in many solo and group exhibitions. His work was also showcased at the Retrospect Galleries, Ren Gallery Los Angeles[, ACCA Galleries Beverly Hills,

Solo exhibitions 

 2019 Ren Gallery "Floral Mind" DTLA, Los Angeles, CA

 2015 Main Street Gallery, "Floral Minds" Walla Walla, Washington

 2010 Raffsonni Galleries, Hackensack, NJ

 2008 Tracy Park Gallery, Santa Monica, CA

 2007 Tracy Park Gallery, Santa Monica, CA

 2006 Tracy Park Gallery, Santa Monica, CA

 2005 Christianne Engs Gallery, West Hollywood, CA

 2005 ArcLight Theatre Gallery, Hollywood, CA

 2004 Donna Ratikan Design Center, Miami, FL

Group exhibitions 

 2021 Retrospect Galleries at CONTEXT Art Miami, FL https://www.contextartmiami.com/

 2021 Retrospect Galleries at Palm Beach Modern + Contemporary | Art Wynwood, FL

 2020 TEW Galleries at Art Miami and CONTEXT Art Miami, FL

 2020 Retrospect Galleries at Art Miami, FL https://www.artmiami.com/

 2019 June Mixx Art Projects, "Understory" Telluride, Colorado

 2019 March  London Art Fair https://hamptonsfineartfair.com/

 2019 March AAF New York

 2018 Context Art Miami, December  Miami, FL

 2018 October  AAF Stockholm

 2018 May Hong Kong Art Fair

 2018 February Hampstead Art Fair, London

 2018 February, Saatchi Art, “Constructed” Santa Monica, CA

 2018 Context Art Miami “Retrospect Galleries”, December 4–9 Miami, FL

 2018 Saatchi Art, "Constructed", February 1, Santa Monica, CA

 2018 LA Art Show "Retrospect Galleries", January 10, January 14, Los Angeles, CA

 2017 SCOPE, International Contemporary Art Show, New York https://scope-art.com/

 2017 Mixx Art Projects, "Beyond The Lines", Telluride, Colorado

 2016 SCOPE, International Contemporary Art Show, November 29-December 4, Miami Beach, FL

 2016 International Art Symposium "Atelier An Der Donau" Vienna, Austria

 2016 Saatchi Art, "Fresh Faces" March 24, Santa Monica, CA

 2016 Art Share-LA, "Faces in the Crowd" April 2, DTLA Los Angeles, CA

 2015 Art Miami, Art Basel Week, December 1–6, G2 Gallery, Miami, FL

 2015 Art Miami, Aqua Art, December 2–6, Spin Gallery's Miami, FL

 2015 Benefit-Kunstauktion Oskar Kokoschka's Museum, Pöchlarn, Austria

 2015 Art In Fall, November 14–19 Group shows New York, NY

 2014 International Art Symposium "Atelier An Der Donau" Vienna Austria

 2014 Works On Paper "Brand 42" Brand Art Center, Glendale CA

 2013 Saatchi Gallery Showdown "Painted Faces" London United Kingdom

 2013 Annual Juried "Small Work Visual Show" Bakersfield Museum Of Art, CA

 2012 Group Show, "Mark Rothko 109th Anniversary", Daugavpils, Latvia

 2012 Art from the Ashes, Barnsdall Gallery Hollywood CA

 2012 Art Cube Gallery Laguna Beach CA

 2011 Los Angeles Municipal art Gallery, LA, CA

 2011 Skinner Howard Contemporary Art Gallery, Sacramento, CA

 2010 Rweeway Gallery, Los Angeles, CA

 2010 FERUS Gallery, West Hollywood, CA

 2009 Primo Piano LivinGallery, Lecce, Italy

 2009 Municipal Art Gallery, Los Angeles, CA

 2008 Brand Gallery OST, Glendale, CA

 2008 Think Space Gallery, Los Angeles, CA

 2008 Tracy Park Gallery, Santa Monica, CA

 2008 Riverside Art Museum, Riverside, CA

 2007 Italian American Museum of Art, Los Angeles, CA

 2007 Museum of Modern Art, Yerevan, Armenia

 2007 Venice Contemporary, Culver City, CA

 2007 Tracy Park Gallery, Santa Monica, CA

 2006 Venice Contemporary, Culver City, CA

 2006 Tracy Park Gallery, Santa Monica, CA

 2004 Pacific Design Center, West Hollywood, CA

Collectors
 Pepsico Company Collection, Dubai, UAE. https://www.pepsico.com/
 Princess Anita Of Hohenberg Collection, Vienna Austria. https://en.wikipedia.org/wiki/Artstetten_Castle
 Victor Drai, Hollywood Entertainment Famous director, Las Vegas, NV.
 Joseph Reap, Collection of, Morgan Stanley Headquarters Manhattan, NYC.
 Nersesian Collection, New York, NYC.
 Timothy G. Smith, Collection West Hollywood, CA.
 Gary Goldstein Design Associates, Irvine, CA.
 Anthony J. Cale & Associates, London, UK.
 Lea Black Collection, Miami, FL.
 Alex Reid Collection, West Village, NY.
 Ryan O'Neal Collection, Golden Globe Nominated Actor, Malibu, CA.
 Deanne-Joel Fried Collection, Los Angeles, CA.
 Maia Neumann Collection, Nice, France.
 Jennifer Jonak Collection, Graswell, OR.
 Denis Sutro Collection, Carver Sutra Wine Company, Napa Valley, CA.
 Elizabeth Turner Ottosen Collection, Basel, Switzerland.
 Samira Barlava Collection, Beverly Hills, CA.
  Poor Hb Collection, London, UK.
 Philipe Caland Collection, Los Angeles, CA.
 Ryan Finley Collection, Portland, OR.
 Scott Bernstein Sony Music headquarters office, Beverly Hills, CA.
 Nishanta Baidya Collection.

Gallery

See also
List of American artists
Culture of Armenia

External links
 
 https://www.youwantedalist.com/blog/minas-halaj
 https://www.juxtapoz.com/news/painting/minas-halaj-s-floral-minds/
 https://obsessedwithart.com/collage-paintings-minas-halaj/
 [http://www.mutantspace.com/
 https://www.pibemagazine.com/art/floral-mind-minas-halaj
 Minas Halaj: "I’m waging war in my art and don’t get involved in other wars"

1981 births
20th-century American painters
 Living people
 Artists from Yerevan
 Armenian emigrants to the United States
21st-century American painters
 Artists from Los Angeles